Precision Manuals Development Group (often abbreviated as PMDG) is a commercial add-on aircraft developer for the Microsoft Flight Simulator, Lockheed Martin Prepar3D, and X-Plane series. The company was founded by airline pilot Robert S. Randazzo, who stated that his ultimate goal was to develop the software to the point where it could be used by airlines and manufacturers to supplement pilot training. The company is based out of Las Vegas, Nevada but has several employees in countries such as Belgium, South Africa, and Canada. It has eight employees as of 2018, with a collection of beta testers which include multiple aviation professionals.

PMDG's software has received praise for its realism.

Company background

Precision Manuals Development Group was founded by Robert S. Randazzo, Senior Developer, in January, 1998.  Originally conceived as a small technical publishing company, PMDG's first product, the 747-400PS1 User's Guide was released in February of 1998.  This 300 page book was developed specifically to provide users of 747-400PS1 by Aerowinx with a detailed, educational guide to assist non-airline pilots in mastering the complexities of the Aerowinx's 747-400 CBT software. Written to be used by pilots and non-pilots alike, the 747-400PS1 User's Guide was a popular handbook in the PS1 community until it was removed from availability in early 2000.

Looking toward the burgeoning add-on software market for Microsoft Flight Simulator, PMDG launched the FS98 Series Aircraft Operating Manual product line for use with Microsoft Flight Simulator '98.

Building on the same detailed, reality-driven style used in the 747-400PS1 User's Guide, the FS98 Series AOM product line was a departure from the previous PMDG product in that it also included a plug-in flight model that, when used in conjunction with MSFS98 provided the airliner enthusiasts with a highly realistic flight model. The success of the FS98 Series Aircraft Operating Manual product line was based largely on simulator enthusiasts desire for greater fidelity and detail in the desktop flight simulation.

In August of 1999, PMDG became the first software developer to formally announce support for FLY! by Terminal Reality.  A relatively unknown company at the time, Terminal Reality was endeavoring to produce a flight simulator experience that more closely mirrored the complexities of modern aviation than previously available retail market simulators.  To this end they succeeded at the general aviation level, but PMDG sought to revolutionize the modeling of airliner simulations by using FLY! as a base for future product development.

Described as "the most ambitious airliner modeling project yet undertaken for the desktop PC," PMDG released the FLY! Airliner Series 757-200ER on December 18, 1999 and the product was an instant hit with simulator enthusiasts.  Designed to provide a complete airliner experience, the FLY! Airliner Series 757-200ER modeled approximately 90% of the systems, switches and functions in the cockpit of the 757-200, all in accurately modeled 3D space.  With hundreds of switches and dozens of complicated systems and procedures to learn, the FLY! Airliner Series 757-200ER included a 160 page operating manual, written in the now classic style of the 747-400 PS1 User's Guide.

The FLY! Airliner Series 767-200/300 was the second product in the FLY! Airliner Series product line, and became the last product in which PMDG used the default autopilot and flight systems display logic included in the stock version of FLY!

Recognizing that a higher level of fidelity could be realized with the appropriate skills, PMDG expanded the development staff to include an additional compliment of highly skilled developers.

On 25 October 2014, it was announced on PMDG's AVSIM forum, that the Boeing 777-200LR base package will be available on the Prepar3D platform.

With employees and contractors working around the world, PMDG is headquartered in Northern Nevada, approximately 15 nm north of Reno-Tahoe International Airport. On June 4, 2012, PMDG announced that they would move back to Virginia, where the company was founded.

Aircraft
PMDG has created nine aircraft for Flight Simulator 2004 and ten aircraft for Flight Simulator X, two of which are extensions of the 747-400X. The PMDG Boeing 737 NGX is for Flight Simulator X and Prepar3d only and is currently available in 737-800/900 winglet/non-winglet models. The 737-600/700 winglet/non-winglet models are a continuation of the base package and are available as an expansion. The 777-200LR and accompanying 777-300ER expansion were the first PMDG products for Lockheed Martin's Prepar3D V2 which was released on February 7, 2015, as well as Flight Simulator X (the NGX was patched to P3D V2 compatibility after the 777).

On June 1, 2016, PMDG released the Douglas DC-6 simulation, marking the first aircraft by the company for the X-Plane series of flight simulators.

With the arrival of P3D v4, the 747, 777 and 737 aircraft are being freely upgraded from P3D v3 (32 bit) to P3D v4 (64 bit). On February 24, 2019, it was announced that no new products would be developed for 32-bit platforms (not precluding updates to existing products). Thus, the B747-8 was the last release for 32-bit platforms, notably marking the end of 13 years of FSX support.  On November 8, 2019, the PMDG NGXu was released. It is a version of the upcoming NG3 product for the Prepar3D platform, and offers the BCF, BDSF, BBJ1 and BBJ2 variants as expansions to the base product. The NG3 itself will only be available on the new Microsoft Flight Simulator due in 2020, with expansion packs covering the entire NG, BBJ, and MAX product lines. PMDG announced the previous day that all development for the X-Plane platform as well as all 32-bit platforms would be canceled. On October 20, 2020, PMDG announced the development of the 777X family of airliners was in an early stage. In mid June 2021, all products for X-Plane and FSX were retired ahead of the release of their first product for the new Microsoft Flight Simulator. On August 24th 2022, the PMDG 737-800 was released for Microsoft Flight Simulator.

References

External links

Microsoft Flight Simulator add-ons
Microsoft Flight Simulator
Software companies based in Virginia
Companies based in Alexandria, Virginia
1997 establishments in Virginia
Software companies of the United States